PCU can refer to:

Education
Pacific Coast University, a law school in Long Beach, California
Pai Chai University in Daejeon, South Korea
Philippine Christian University in Manila, Philippines

Finance
PCU, a former NYSE ticker symbol for Southern Copper Corporation
Patelco Credit Union, a credit union in California

Politics
Partido Comunista de Unificación, the Communist Unification Party in Spain
Partido Comunista del Uruguay, the Communist Party of Uruguay

Technology
PCU, the IATA airport code for Poplarville-Pearl River County Airport
Packet Control Unit, part of the Base Station Subsystem in a GSM network
Passenger Car Unit, a metric used in transportation engineering
Photo conductor unit, the fuser drum unit used in laser printers

Other
PCU (film), a 1994 film lampooning political correctness on college campuses, set at the fictitious Port Chester University
Portage Credit Union Centre, an ice hockey and recreational complex in Portage la Prairie, Manitoba
Pre-Commissioning Unit, a description used for United States Navy vessels prior to commission and the personnel units assigned to them
Progressive care unit, an intermediate coronary care unit